Jilu (also Romanized as Jīlū) is a village in Darbqazi Rural District, in the Central District of Nishapur County, Razavi Khorasan Province, Iran. At the 2006 census, its population was 608, in 161 families.

References 

Populated places in Nishapur County